Lacunaria crenata is a species of flowering plant in the family Ochnaceae, native from Central America to Brazil. It was first described by Edmond Tulasne in 1849 as Quiina crenata.

Distribution
Lacunaria crenata is native to Central America (Costa Rica, Honduras and  Nicaragua and Panama) and northern South America (Brazil, Colombia, Ecuador, French Guiana, Guyana, Peru,Suriname and Venezuela).

Subspecies
, Plants of the World Online accepted two subspecies:
Lacunaria crenata subsp. crenata
Lacunaria crenata subsp. decastyla (Radlk.) J.V.Schneid. & Zizka

Conservation
Lacunaria panamensis was assessed as "endangered" in the 1998 IUCN Red List, where it is said to be native only to Costa Rica, Honduras, and Panama. , L. panamensis was regarded as a synonym of L. crenata subsp. crenata, which has a much wider distribution, being found throughout the range of L. crenata.

References

Ochnaceae
Flora of Brazil
Flora of Colombia
Flora of Costa Rica
Flora of Ecuador
Flora of French Guiana
Flora of Guyana
Flora of Honduras
Flora of Nicaragua
Flora of Panama
Flora of Peru
Flora of Suriname
Flora of Venezuela
Plants described in 1849